The Taewon Kim clan is one of the Korean clans. Their Bon-gwan is in Taiyuan, Shanxi, China, also called Taewon in Korean. According to the census held by Korea in 2000, the number of their family was 800, and the population of Taewon Kim clan was 2557. Their founder was  who was appointed as an Inspector-Official (御史) in Fujian during Wanli Emperor’s reign in Ming dynasty. His son named Gim Pyeong (金坪) was naturalized in Korea.

See also 
 Korean clan names of foreign origin

References

External links